BIIT may refer to:

 Bangladesh Institute of Islamic Thought, a think-tank in Bangladesh
 Barani Institute of Information Technology, an institution in Pakistan